Scopula homodoxa is a moth of the  family Geometridae. It is found in Tonga and Fiji.

References

Moths described in 1886
homodoxa
Moths of Oceania